Arina Folts (born 1 January 1997) is an Uzbekistani former tennis player.

Folts was awarded a wildcard to make her WTA Tour debut at the 2013 Tashkent Open, losing in the first round to María Teresa Torró Flor of Spain. She partnered with Guzal Yusupova to compete in the doubles event, but they lost to Veronika Kapshay and Teodora Mirčić in the first round.

Playing for Uzbekistan Fed Cup team, Folts has a win–loss record of 2–7.

ITF finals

Doubles (2–5)

Fed Cup participation

Singles

Doubles

References

External links
 
 
 

1997 births
Living people
Sportspeople from Tashkent
Uzbekistani female tennis players
Tennis players at the 2014 Asian Games
Asian Games competitors for Uzbekistan
Uzbekistani people of German descent
21st-century Uzbekistani women